MS Express Aphrodite was a ferry originally named St. Columba. Built in 1977, at the Aalborg Shipyard in Denmark, St. Columba was originally a Sealink UK ferry, operating between Holyhead and Dún Laoghaire in the Irish Sea. She laterally operated between Duba and Jeddah for Namma Shipping Lines. She was beached at Gadani for scrapping in December 2021.

Fire 

On 31 January 1990, a fire broke out in the engine room of St. Columba. None of the 199 passengers on board were injured, however a fireman suffered a fractured ulna.

The Captain praised the work of the staff on board the ferry in preventing the spread of the fire, and keeping the passengers safe and re-assured. As there was too much oil to re-ignite the engines, the ship had to be towed for the remainder of the journey to Holyhead port.

Ownership by Stena Line 

In 1990, Sealink was taken over by Stena Line, and with this new investment, came an £8 million re-fit for St Columba, and her name was changed to Stena Hibernia. In 1996, with the introduction of the HSS fast ferries, Hibernia was again re-named, this time as Stena Adventurer, with the intention of her moving to the English Channel to serve the Dover to Calais route. This move, however, never materialised, and Stena Adventurer was sold to Agapitos Express Ferries of Greece.

Ownership by Agapitos Express Ferries 
Stena Adventurer was renamed Express Aphrodite.

Previous names 
 St. Columba (1977–1990)
 Stena Hibernia (1990–1996)
 Stena Adventurer (1996–)
 Express Aphrodite

Demolition 
Masarrah was beached as Asarrah at Gadani, Pakistan, on the morning of 2 December 2021.  She was flying the flag of Gabon at the time.

References 

https://web.archive.org/web/20110711165356/http://www.hhvferry.com/stcolumba.html
http://www.sealink-holyhead.com/sealink/ships/st_columba_sealink/fire.html
http://www.sealink-holyhead.com/sealink/ships/st_columba_sealink/home.html

Cruiseferries
1976 ships
Ships built in Aalborg
Ships of British Rail